Pseudoxenodon bambusicola, commonly known as the bamboo snake or bamboo false cobra, is a species of snake in the family Colubridae. The species is found in China, Vietnam, Laos, and Thailand .

Description
These snakes can range in color from light brown to a grey purple with black to red banding down its body. Being that it is a false cobra it will raise up when it feels threatened and spread its neck into a small hood. The hood has a pointed oval ring that spans the length and it has a black band across its large circular eyes. These snakes can reach up to  100 cm (3.5 feet) in length.

Habitat
This snake can be found in northern Thailand, northern Laos, northern Vietnam and southern China. They reside in wetlands near rocky terrain, moving mostly through leaf litter and vegetation close to the ground where they can stay hidden from predators.

Diet
This species has been observed eating frogs, but it likely also eats small lizards, and insects when it's a hatchling.

Behaviour
This snake is active during the day, hunting hidden in vegetation, ambushing small prey. When threatened this snake tends to react aggressively rearing up and flattening its hood. It will strike repeatedly with several false bites before it will engage a true strike. It is rear fanged so its bite, while painful and latching, is generally harmless. It is mildly venomous, but with the fang position and potency, there have been no known injuries or deaths attributed to this species.

Conservation

These snakes are quite prevalent throughout their range and currently do not face any threats to their habitat or breeding population.

References

Pseudoxenodon
Reptiles described in 1922
Reptiles of China
Reptiles of Vietnam
Reptiles of Laos
Reptiles of Thailand
Taxa named by Theodor Vogt